Minuscule 888 (in the Gregory-Aland numbering), Θε430 (von Soden), is a 14th-century Greek minuscule manuscript of the New Testament on paper, with a commentary. The codex has an unusual order of the Gospels. The manuscript was prepared for liturgical use.

Description 

The codex contains the text of the four Gospels, with a commentary, on 307 paper leaves (size ). The text is written in one column per page, 47 lines per page. The Gospels follow in an unusual order: Matthew, John, Mark and Luke (as 594).

Folios 1-63 contain a commentary to the Prophets by Theophylact of Ohrid.
It contains some additional non-biblical matter at the end.

Text 
The Greek text of the codex is unknown. Kurt Aland did not place it in any Category.
It was not examined according to the Claremont Profile Method.

History 

According to C. R. Gregory it was written in the 14th or 15th century. Currently the manuscript is dated by the INTF to the 14th century. The manuscript was added to the list of New Testament manuscripts by Scrivener (888e) and Gregory (888e). Gregory saw it in 1886.

It is not cited in critical editions of the Greek New Testament (UBS4, NA28). Currently the manuscript is housed at the Biblioteca Marciana (Gr. Z. 26 (340)), in Venice.

See also 

 List of New Testament minuscules (1–1000)
 Biblical manuscript
 Textual criticism
 Minuscule 889

References

Further reading

External links 
 

Greek New Testament minuscules
14th-century biblical manuscripts